Moshe "Mori" Arkin (born 1952/53) is an Israeli billionaire businessman, the founder and chairman of Arkin Holdings, a pharmaceutical company.

Early life
Mori Arkin is the son of Ziama Arkin, who died in 1972, when Mori was 19. Arkin has a degree in psychology and philosophy from Tel Aviv University.

Career
In 1961, his father Ziama Arkin founded Agis Industries, an Israeli pharmaceutical importer. Agis grew into a generic pharmaceutical manufacturer, and in 2005, Mori Arkin sold Agis to Perrigo for $390 million.

Arkin is the founder and chairman of Arkin Holdings, a pharmaceutical company. He is the co-founder and chairman of the Accelmed Fund.

Personal life
Arkin is married with three children, and lives in Herzliya Pituah, Israel.

References

1950s births
Israeli billionaires
Living people